Saavedra Partido is a partido of Buenos Aires Province in Argentina.

Settlements
Pigüé
Saavedra
Espartillar
Goyena
Arroyo Corto
Dufaur
Colonia San Martín

External links
Federal Site (Spanish)
Saavedra Website (Spanish)
Information about Saavedra (Spanish)

1891 establishments in Argentina
Partidos of Buenos Aires Province
Volga German diaspora